The Toledo Rockets men's basketball team represents the University of Toledo in Toledo, Ohio. The school's team currently competes in the Mid-American Conference. The team last played in the NCAA Division I men's basketball tournament in 1980. Their current head coach is  Tod Kowalczyk.

Postseason

NCAA tournament results
The Rockets have appeared in four NCAA Tournaments. Their combined record is 1–4.

* In 1979 there were two first-round games in their region prior to the second round but Toledo did not play in a first-round game.

NIT results
The Rockets have appeared in ten National Invitation Tournaments (NIT). Their combined record is 5–13.

CIT results
The Rockets have appeared in one CollegeInsider.com Postseason Tournament (CIT). Their  record is 1–1.

CBI results
The Rockets have appeared in one College Basketball Invitational (CBI). Their record is 0–1.

CCA/NCIT results
The Rockets appeared in one of the two National Commissioners Invitational Tournaments, in 1974, and went 1-1.

Retired numbers 
In 2007, the Rockets retired former forward Steve Mix's number 50, making him the first player in program history to have his number retired.

Rockets players in the NBA

John Brisker
Cal Christensen
Larry Jones
Tom Kozelko
Phil Martin
Dick Miller
Steve Mix
George Patterson
Jim Ray
Ryan Rollins
Paul Seymour
Casey Shaw

References

External links